Edele is both a surname and a female given name. People with the name include:

Surname:
Mark Edele, Australian historian
Given name:
Edele Jernskjæg (died 1512), Danish noble
Edele Kruchow (1915–1989), Danish headmistress and politician
Edele Lynch (1979), Irish singer, songwriter, and television personality